The Tower of Sponsaglia is a ruined Genoese tower located on the border between the communes of Bonifacio, Corse-du-Sud and Porto-Vecchio on the south east coast of the Corsica. Only the round base survives.

The tower was one of a series of coastal defences constructed by the Republic of Genoa between 1530 and 1620 to stem the attacks by Barbary pirates.

See also
List of Genoese towers in Corsica

References

Towers in Corsica